Federico Cattaneo (born 14 July 1993) is an Italian sprinter who won a bronze medal at the 2018 Mediterranean Games.

National records
 4×100 m relay: 38.11 ( Doha, 4 October 2019), he ran first leg in the team with Marcell Jacobs, Davide Manenti, Filippo Tortu; former holder

National titles
 Italian Athletics Championships
 100 metres: 2017

See also
 Italy at the 2018 Mediterranean Games
 Italy at the 2018 European Athletics Championships

References

External links
 

1993 births
Living people
Italian male sprinters
Athletes (track and field) at the 2018 Mediterranean Games
Mediterranean Games bronze medalists for Italy
Mediterranean Games medalists in athletics
European Games competitors for Italy
Athletes (track and field) at the 2019 European Games
World Athletics Championships athletes for Italy
Sportspeople from the Province of Varese
Italian Athletics Championships winners